The 2013 St. Francis Brooklyn Terriers men's soccer team represented St. Francis College during the 2013 NCAA Division I men's soccer season. The Terrier's home games were played at Brooklyn Bridge Park, the inaugural season of the field. Last year, the team played at the Aviator Sports Complex. The team has been a member of the Northeast Conference since 1981 and is coached by Tom Giovatto, who is in his seventh year at the helm of the Terriers.

In 2013, St. Francis went on to win at least 10 games for the 4th time in 7 years under head coach Tom Giovatto and qualified for the Northeast Conference Tournament with the 4th seed for the 11th time in their history. The Terriers defeated 1st seed Central Connecticut State 2–0 in the semifinals and defeated 3rd seed Bryant 3–2 in overtime for the Championship. Kevin Correa was named Tournament Most Valuable Player, scoring 4 goals in the Tournament (2 against the Blue Devils and 2 against the Bulldogs). With the NEC Tournament Championship, the Terriers received an automatic bid to the NCAA tournament and they faced Penn State in the first round on November 21, 2013, losing 0–1.

During the 2013 campaign, the St. Francis Brooklyn men's soccer team catapulted to 2nd in the NSCAA/Continental Tire NCAA Division I North Atlantic Regional Poll ranking for October 23 to October 29 after winning 7 consecutive matches.  For the Terriers, it is the highest they have been ranked since 2011, when they were fourth from October 4 to October 11. For the final NSCAA/Continental Tire NCAA Division I North Atlantic Regional Poll of the season the Terriers were ranked 1st; this is the first time in their history being ranked 1st. The Terriers were also ranked 49th Nationally in the  NCAA Men's Soccer RPI at the end of the season.

After the season several Terriers received accolades; Junior forward Kevin Correa along with defender and co-captain Andy Cormack garnered All-NSCAA First Team accolades while senior forward Gabriel Bagot was named to the Second Team of the North Atlantic Region. Head coach Tom Giovatto was named North Atlantic Region Coach of the Year. Kevin Correa was then named to the 2013 NSCAA/Continental Tire NCAA Division I Men's All-America Third Team.

After their NEC Championship season the Terriers lost 5 starters to graduation and their best offensive player Kevin Correa who transferred to the New Mexico Lobos.

2013 squad
As of September 2, 2013.

Captains in bold

Schedule 

|-
!colspan=6 style="background:#0038A8; border: 2px solid #CE1126;;color:#FFFFFF;"| Non-Conference Regular Season
|-

|-
!colspan=6 style="background:#0038A8; border: 2px solid #CE1126;;color:#FFFFFF;"| Northeast Conference Regular Season
|-

   
|-
!colspan=12 style="background:#0038A8; border: 2px solid #CE1126;;color:#FFFFFF;"| Northeast Conference Tournament
|-

|-
!colspan=12 style="background:#0038A8; border: 2px solid #CE1126;;color:#FFFFFF;"| NCAA Tournament
|-
 
|-

2013 NSCAA/Continental Tire College rankings

See also 
 2013 Northeast Conference men's soccer season
 2013 NCAA Division I men's soccer season
 Northeast Conference Men's Soccer Tournament
 2013 NCAA Division I Men's Soccer Championship

References 

St. Francis Brooklyn Terriers
St. Francis Brooklyn Terriers men's soccer seasons
St. Francis Brooklyn Terriers